Anders Bergcrantz (born 1961 in Malmö, Sweden) is a Swedish jazz trumpeter and composer.

Bergcrantz has recorded several albums as a leader and on many more as a sideman. He has twice been awarded the Gyllene Skivan (the Golden Record) by Sweden's Orkesterjournalen jazz magazine: in 1995 for In This Together, and again in 2007 for About Time. His influences as a trumpeter include Freddie Hubbard, Lee Morgan and Woody Shaw.

Discography

As leader
Touch (Dragon, 1986 [1987])
Live at Sweet Basil (Dragon, 1995)
In This Together (Dragon, 1995)
C (Dragon, 1997)
Twenty-Four Hours (Dragon, 1997)
In This Together (Dragon, 1999)
About Time (Stunt, 2007)
Elevate (Vanguard Music Boulevard, 2020)

As sideman
With Jan Kaspersen
Space And Rhythm Jazz (Olufsen, 1987)
Live in Sofie's Cellar, Vol. 1 (Olufsen, 1991)
With Dave Liebman
 Guided Dream (Dragon, 1985) – with the Tolvan Big Band (recorded in Malmo, Sweden)
With Page One
 Live at Ronnie Scott's (Storyville, 1990)

References 

1961 births
Living people
Swedish jazz trumpeters
Male trumpeters
21st-century trumpeters
21st-century Swedish male musicians
Male jazz musicians